NeWest Press is a Canadian publishing company. Established in Edmonton, Alberta, in 1977, the company grew out of a literary magazine, NeWest Review, which had been launched in 1975. Early members of the collective that established the company included writer Rudy Wiebe and University of Alberta academics Douglas Barbour, George Melnyk, and Diane Bessai.

The first title published by the company was Getting Here, an anthology of short stories by students in Barbour's and Wiebe's creative writing classes at the University of Alberta, which included Aritha Van Herk, Myrna Kostash, Candas Jane Dorsey, Caterina Edwards, and Helen Rosta.

The company publishes literary fiction, non-fiction, poetry, mystery novels, and drama, with a particular but not exclusive interest in books by authors from Western Canada. The company also publishes a separate line, Nunatak, devoted to work by first-time authors. Its Writer as Critic series is devoted to non-fiction essays of literary and cultural criticism by noted Canadian writers, while its Prairie Play series is one of Canada's oldest surviving lines of drama publishing. Sharon Pollock's play Blood Relations remains one of the company's all-time bestselling titles.

The company's board of directors includes Douglas Barbour (president), Anne Nothof (vice-president), Don Kerr (treasurer), Jenna Butler (secretary), Diane Bessai (honorary member), Merrill Distad, Kit Dobson, Paul Hjartarson, Smaro Kamboureli, Nicole Markotic, Suzette Mayr, Michael Phair, Linda Quirk, Eva Radford, and Leslie Vermeer.

Writers
Authors who have been published by the company include:

References

External links
NeWest Press

Book publishing companies of Canada
1977 establishments in Alberta
Companies based in Edmonton
Publishing companies established in 1977